Agim Sherifi (born 20 August 1994) is an Albanian footballer who has played as a goalkeeper for KF Laçi in the Albanian Superliga. Born in Canada, he had a spell at Italian side Taranto in 2012. He left Laçi in January 2016.

Career statistics

Club

References

External links
 Profile - FSHF

1998 births
Living people
Soccer players from Toronto
Canadian people of Albanian descent
Albanian footballers
Association football goalkeepers
KF Laçi players
Kategoria Superiore players